Ross Beach (born 1973, New Orleans, LA) is a musician, songwriter and record producer living in Portland, Oregon.  While attending college in Ruston, Louisiana in the early to mid-1980s, he was a frequent collaborator with a group of musicians who later became known as The Elephant 6 Recording Company, a collective which began an independent record label.

He is a board member and co-founder of the non-profit, Portland-only music festival PDX Pop Now!

Discography
Ross and the Hellpets: Optimism (2006, A Bouncing Space Recordings, ABS011 CD)
Ross Beach: Country (2005, A Bouncing Space Recordings, ABS010 CD)
Ross Beach: You Make It Look So Easy (2002, A Bouncing Space Records, CD, 40 min)
Ross and the Hellpets: Teddy Bears Gone Bad (2001, Hotstream/Chicken Ranch, CD-R, 25 min)
Ross Beach: Ride Theory (1999, Chicken Ranch Records, CD, 60 min)
Ross Beach: Tender Severity (1997, Chicken Ranch Records, cassette, 60 min)
Ross Beach: Utopian Love Songs (1996, limited release, cassette, 60 min)
Ross Beach: They Call Me "Chuck" (1996, limited release, cassette EP, 18 min)
Ross Beach: Cheesequake (1995, limited release, cassette, 60 min)
Ross Beach: The Hand-Crafted Heart Sickness Calliope

As well, several recordings appear on compilations with other artists.

References
Cooper, Kim "Neutral Milk Hotel's In the Aeroplane Over the Sea (33)", pg 10, 2005

External links
Official homepage of Ross Beach
[ Allmusic.com - Ross Beach]

1973 births
Living people
American pop musicians